Argyrotaenia lignitaenia is a species of moth of the family Tortricidae. It is found in the United States, where it has been recorded from California.

Adults have been recorded on wing in April.

References

Moths described in 1965
lignitaenia
Moths of North America